Dara Strolovitch is an American political scientist, currently Professor of Women's Gender, and Sexuality Studies, American Studies, and Political Science at Yale University. She studies the politics of race, class, gender, and sexuality in the context of intersectional societal inequality, and the representation of those who are marginalized in multiple overlapping ways.

Education and early career
Strolovitch attended Vassar College, earning a BA in political science with a minor in women's studies in 1992. She attended Yale University for graduate school, earning an MA in political science in 1998, an MPhil in political science in 2002, and a PhD in political science also in 2002. Between 2000 and 2001, she was a research fellow at The Brookings Institution. In 2001, Strolovitch became a professor of political science at the University of Minnesota, before moving to Princeton University in 2013. She has been a visiting scholar at Georgetown University, Stanford University, and The Russell Sage Foundation.

In 2021, she was hired by Yale University as a full professor.

Career
Strolovitch's first book, published in 2007, is called Affirmative Advocacy: Race, Class, and Gender in Interest Group Politics. Strolovitch uses a survey and interviews to study the political representation of interest groups, with a theory of interest group effectiveness that builds on the idea of intersectionality. The findings of the book include evidence that already advantaged groups are better represented by interest group politics than disadvantaged groups are, and that often interest groups focus more on the legislative and executive branches of the US government than they do on the judicial branch. In reviewing the book, Bryan D. Jones wrote that "the empiricism is as strong or stronger than the best of the existing interest group studies". Affirmative Advocacy received multiple awards from caucuses of the American Political Science Association, as well as an award from the American Sociological Association, and excerpts have been used in American politics textbooks.

Strolovitch also co-edited the CQ Guide to Interest Groups and Lobbying with Burdett Loomis and Peter Francia, and she has a forthcoming book called When Bad Things Happen to Privileged People: Race, Gender, and the Political Construction of Crisis & Non-Crisis.

Strolovitch is a member of the 2020-2024 editorial leadership of the American Political Science Review, which is the most selective political science journal. She was also a founding associate editor of the Journal of Race, Ethnicity, and Politics.

Strolovitch has written and been cited extensively in media outlets like The Washington Post, Vox, Mic, and Glamour.

Selected works

 Forthcoming

Selected awards
2010 Best Paper Award, APSA section on Political Organizations and Parties
2016 Mansbridge Award, National Women's Caucus for Political Science
2018 Outstanding Career Award, Midwest Political Science Association Women's Caucus

References

Living people
Date of birth missing (living people)
American women academics
American women political scientists
American political scientists
Princeton University faculty
University of Minnesota faculty
Vassar College alumni
Yale University alumni
Year of birth missing (living people)
21st-century American women